WQLV (98.9 FM) is a hot adult contemporary music formatted radio station in Millersburg, Pennsylvania. The station is primarily intended to serve the Harrisburg, Pennsylvania, metropolitan area. The station was assigned the WQLV call letters by the Federal Communications Commission on December 13, 1991.

A noteworthy fact about this station is that it features an "oldies/classic hits" (predominantly 1970s music) show on Sunday mornings, which is becoming considerably rare for AC stations. From 8 AM-12 noon on Sundays, the station broadcasts Dick Bartley's syndicated program "The Classic Countdown".

The station also broadcasts hourly news from ABC, as well as local high school sports (usually football and basketball) of schools in the Twin/Tri Valley League as well as the Mid Penn conference. Lead announcer Jeff Deitz and Color-Commentator Steven Heimbach anchor the weekly football broadcast.

References

External links
WQLV official website

Mainstream adult contemporary radio stations in the United States
QLV